Cush or Kush (Kūš), according to the Hebrew Bible, was the oldest son of Ham and a grandson of Noah. He was the brother of Mizraim, Phut, and Canaan. Cush was the father of Nimrod, a king called the "first heroic warrior on earth".

Cush is traditionally considered the ancestor of the "land of Cush", an ancient territory believed to have been located near the Red Sea. Cush is identified in the Bible with the Kingdom of Kush or ancient Sudan. The Cushitic languages are named after Cush.

Identification

Cush is a Hebrew name that is possibly derived from Kash, the Egyptian name of Upper Nubia and later of the Nubian kingdom at Napata, known as the Kingdom of Kush. 

The form Kush appears in Egyptian records as early as the reign of Mentuhotep II (21st century BC), in an inscription detailing his campaigns against the Nubian region. At the time of the compilation of the Hebrew Bible, and throughout classical antiquity, the Nubian kingdom was centered at Meroë in the modern-day nation of Sudan.

References in Bible

Cush's sons were Nimrod, Seba, Havilah, Sabtah, Raamah, and Sabtechah.

Traditional identifications
Josephus gives an account of the nation of Cush, son of Ham and grandson of Noah: "For of the four sons of Ham, time has not at all hurt the name of Cush; for the Ethiopians, over whom he reigned, are even at this day, both by themselves and by all men in Asia, called Cushites" (Antiquities of the Jews 1.6).

The Book of Numbers 12:1 calls a wife of Moses "a Cushite woman", whereas Moses's wife Zipporah is usually described as hailing from Midian. Ezekiel the Tragedian's Exagoge 60-65 (fragments reproduced in Eusebius) has Zipporah describe herself as a stranger in Midian, and proceeds to describe the inhabitants of her ancestral lands in North Africa:
"Stranger, this land is called Libya. It is inhabited by tribes of various peoples, Ethiopians, dark men. One man is the ruler of the land: he is both king and general. He rules the state, judges the people, and is priest. This man is my father and theirs."

During the 5th century AD, Syrian writers described the Himyarites of South Arabia as Cushaeans and Ethiopians.

The Persian historian al-Tabari (c. 915) recounts a tradition that the wife of Cush was named Qarnabil, daughter of Batawil, son of Tiras, and that she bore him the "Abyssinians, Sindis and Indians".

Explorer James Bruce, who visited the Ethiopian Highlands c. 1770, wrote of "a tradition among the Abyssinians, which they say they have had since time immemorial", that in the days after the Deluge, Cush, the son of Ham, traveled with his family up the Nile until they reached the Atbara plain, then still uninhabited, from where they could see the Ethiopian table-land. There they ascended and built Axum, and sometime later returned to the lowland, building Meroë. He also states that European scholars of his own day had summarily rejected this account on grounds of their established theory, that Cush must have arrived in Africa via Arabia and the Bab-el-Mandeb, a strait located between Yemen on the Arabian Peninsula, and Djibouti and Eritrea on the Horn of Africa. Further, the great obelisk of Axum was said to have been erected by Cush in order to mark his allotted territory, and his son Ityopp'is was said to have been buried there, according to the Book of Aksum, which Bruce asserts was revered throughout Abyssinia equally with the Kebra Nagast.

Scholars like Johann Michaelis and Rosenmuller have pointed out that the name Cush was applied to tracts of country on both sides of the Red Sea, in the Arabian Peninsula (Yemen) and Northeast Africa.

References

Cush
Kingdom of Kush
Children of Ham (son of Noah)
Noach (parashah)
Nimrod
Book of Genesis people
Books of Chronicles people